= Thimmapura-M-Amminabhavi =

Thimmapura, Dharwad Thimmapura
- Village
- Country: India
- State: Karnataka
- District: Dharwad

Government
  - Type: Panchayat raj
  - Body: Gram panchayat

Population (2011)
  - Total: 1,921

Languages
  - Official: Kannada
- Time zone: UTC+5:30 (IST)
- ISO 3166 code: IN-KA
- Vehicle registration: KA
- Website: karnataka.gov.in

Thimmapura is a village in Dharwad district of Karnataka, India.Located at a distance of 10 kilometres from the city of Dharwad It is well known for Hanuman temple which lies at the central part of the village. The village is closely surrounded by many other villages namely Karadigudda, Marewad and Amminabhavi. The main occupation of the people of this village is agriculture. The agricultural land of the village is known for being very fertile. It is one of the rapidly growing villages under the district of Dharwad. With modern schools being set up the literacy rate of the village is thriving and people are making it to mainstream. Many scholars and educationists hail from the village. The famous school of Jnanajyothi Vidyalaya is located in the same village which is faming itself by availing the quality education to the children of surrounding villages.

== Demographics ==
As of the 2011 Census of India there were 389 households in Thimmapura-M-Amminabhavi and a total population of 1,921 consisting of 988 males and 933 females. There were 234 children ages 0-6.
